In group theory, Cayley's theorem, named in honour of Arthur Cayley, states that every group  is isomorphic to a subgroup of a symmetric group. 
Explicitly,

When  is finite,  is finite too. The proof of Cayley's theorem in this case shows that if  is a finite group of order , then  is isomorphic to a subgroup of the standard symmetric group . The problem of finding the minimal-order symmetric group into which a given group  embeds is rather difficult.

Alperin and Bell note that "in general the fact that finite groups are imbedded in symmetric groups has not influenced the methods used to study finite groups".

When  is infinite,  is infinite, but Cayley's theorem still applies.

History 
While it seems elementary enough, at the time the modern definitions did not exist, and when Cayley introduced what are now called groups it was not immediately clear that this was equivalent to the previously known groups, which are now called permutation groups. Cayley's theorem unifies the two.

Although Burnside 
attributes the theorem 
to Jordan, 
Eric Nummela 
nonetheless argues that the standard name—"Cayley's Theorem"—is in fact appropriate.  Cayley, in his original 1854 paper, 
showed that the correspondence in the theorem is one-to-one, but he failed to explicitly show it was a homomorphism (and thus an embedding).  However, Nummela notes that Cayley made this result known to the mathematical community at the time, thus predating Jordan by 16 years or so.

The theorem was later published by Walther Dyck in 1882 and is attributed to Dyck in the first edition of Burnside's book.

Background 

In particular, taking  to be the underlying set of a group  produces a symmetric group denoted .

Proof of the theorem 
By the existence of inverses, this function has also an inverse, . So multiplication by g acts as a bijective function. Thus, fg is a permutation of G, and so is a member of Sym(G).

for all x in G, and hence:

The homomorphism T is injective since  (the identity element of Sym(G)) implies that  for all x in G, and taking x to be the identity element e of G yields , i.e. the kernel is trivial. Alternatively, T is also injective since  implies that  (because every group is cancellative).

Thus G is isomorphic to the image of T, which is the subgroup K.

T is sometimes called the regular representation of G.

Alternative setting of proof 
An alternative setting uses the language of group actions. We consider the group  as acting on itself by left multiplication, i.e. , which has a permutation representation, say .

Suppose . Then, . Thus,  is trivial. The result follows by use of the first isomorphism theorem, from which we get .

Remarks on the regular group representation
The identity element of the group corresponds to the identity permutation. All other group elements correspond to derangements: permutations that do not leave any element unchanged. Since this also applies for powers of a group element, lower than the order of that element, each element corresponds to a permutation that consists of cycles all of the same length: this length is the order of that element. The elements in each cycle form a right coset of the subgroup generated by the element.

Examples of the regular group representation
Z2 = {0,1} with addition modulo 2; group element 0 corresponds to the identity permutation e, group element 1 to permutation (12) (see cycle notation).

 with addition modulo 3; group element 0 corresponds to the identity permutation e, group element 1 to permutation (123), and group element 2 to permutation (132). E.g. 1 + 1 = 2 corresponds to (123)(123) = (132).

Z4 = {0,1,2,3} with addition modulo 4; the elements correspond to e, (1234), (13)(24), (1432).

The elements of Klein four-group {e, a, b, c} correspond to e, (12)(34), (13)(24), and (14)(23).

S3 (dihedral group of order 6) is the group of all permutations of 3 objects, but also a permutation group of the 6 group elements, and the latter is how it is realized by its regular representation.

More general statement

Theorem: 
Let  be a group, and let  be a subgroup.

The special case  is Cayley's original theorem.

See also 
 Wagner–Preston theorem is the analogue for inverse semigroups.
 Birkhoff's representation theorem, a similar result in order theory
 Frucht's theorem, every finite group is the automorphism group of a graph
 Yoneda lemma, a generalization of Cayley's theorem in category theory
 Representation theorem

Notes

References 
 .

Permutations
Theorems about finite groups
Articles containing proofs